Anita Kobuß (born 13 February 1944) is an East German sprint canoeist who competed in the late 1960s. She won a gold medal in the K-2 500 m event and bronze medals in the K-1 500 m and K-4 500 m events at the 1966 ICF Canoe Sprint World Championships in East Berlin.

Kobuß finished fifth in the K-2 500 m event at the 1968 Summer Olympics in Mexico City.

References

External links
 
 

1944 births
Living people
East German female canoeists
ICF Canoe Sprint World Championships medalists in kayak
Olympic canoeists of East Germany
Canoeists at the 1968 Summer Olympics
People from Mittweida
Sportspeople from Saxony